Ahmed Best (born August 19, 1973) is an American actor, comedian and musician. He is known for providing motion capture and the voice of the character of Jar Jar Binks in the Star Wars franchise.

Best likewise collaborated with director George Lucas in three films and seven episodes of the cartoon show, Star Wars: The Clone Wars. He won the Annie Award for Voice Acting in an Animated Television Production for lampooning Jar Jar Binks in Robot Chicken: Star Wars Episode II.

Early life 
Ahmed Best was born in New York City on August 19, 1973. Born in Roosevelt Hospital, he lived the majority of his formative years in the Soundview section of the Bronx, before moving to Maplewood, New Jersey in 1984. He attended Columbia High School, graduating in 1991. He then studied percussion at the Manhattan School of Music.

He is the younger brother of Dunia Best Sinnreich, lead singer and co-founder of Brave New Girl, Dubistry and Agent 99 and formerly with The Slackers.

Career 
In 1994, Best joined the acid jazz group The Jazzhole. He contributed to the success of the group for two years. He co-wrote and co-produced three albums for the group including The Jazzhole, And the Feeling Goes Around, and The Beat is the Bomb. In 1995, he co-wrote and co-produced Escape by Bill Evans.

In 1995, he joined the Obie Award winning cast of Stomp. He toured with the cast of Stomp throughout the US and Europe.

In 1997, after casting director Robin Gurland had observed his flexible, athletic movements in Stomp, Ahmed was cast as Jar Jar Binks in the Star Wars prequel trilogy (1999–2005). He reprised the role on the Star Wars–themed episode of Robot Chicken (as well as its sequel), Star Wars: The Clone Wars, and on an episode of Stephen Colbert's The Colbert Report. Best said he put a lot of himself into the character, so when Jar Jar drew hostility from audiences, it sometimes extended toward the actor or he otherwise interpreted it personally. The character of Jar Jar Binks was so disliked that Best considered suicide. Best later appeared with fellow Star Wars alumni Dee Bradley Baker, James Arnold Taylor, and Daran Norris on the TV show Big Time Rush.

In 2008,  he also wrote, directed, and produced the pilot for a television show called This Can't Be My Life.

In late May 2020, Lucasfilm announced that Best would be starring as Jedi Master Kelleran Beq in a game-show called Star Wars: Jedi Temple Challenge, with a scheduled release date of June 3, 2020. It was later reported that Jedi Temple Challenge release date had been delayed until June 10 as a result of the unrest surrounding George Floyd's murder.

Filmography

Film

Television

Short films

Documentary

Music

Composer

Director

Video games

Producer

Writer

Theatre

Discography

References

External links 

20th-century American male actors
21st-century American male actors
African-American male actors
American male film actors
American male stage actors
American male video game actors
American male voice actors
Annie Award winners
1973 births
Living people
Manhattan School of Music alumni
Male actors from New York City
People from Maplewood, New Jersey
People from the Bronx
Columbia High School (New Jersey) alumni
Jazzhole members
Male motion capture actors
20th-century African-American people
21st-century African-American people